Starke Herzen is a German television series.

See also
List of German television series

2006 German television series debuts
2006 German television series endings
German-language television shows
Das Erste original programming